Kamalia is a city in the Toba Tek Singh District of Punjab, Pakistan. It is the administrative center of Kamalia Tehsil. It is the 42nd largest city of Pakistan by population and has a lot more population compared to nearby cities like Rajana, Chichawatni and Pir Mahal.

Location
Kamalia is bounded in the South by River Ravi and Chichawatni, in the West by Pir Mahal, in the North by Rajana and Mamu Kanjan, and in the East by Harappa and Sahiwal.

Under-construction M-4 motorway (Pakistan) Section soon is expected to connect the cities of Gojra, Toba Tek Singh, Shorkot to Kamalia.

Kamalia City is historical city situated on the bank of River Ravi. The history discloses the town was established prior to the times of Alaxender AKA Sikander in local language. Preliminary it was named Kot Kamal in the Honour of most prominent personality Kamal Khan who was the head of Kharal tribe residing in huge number around Kamalia and whole of Sandal Bar.

History
Kamalia is said to be existing even before the Alexander the Great. The legend suggests that Alexander tried to invade and win the then walled city (which used to exist with a prehistoric name) in the morning when the people of the city opened its gate for a morning walk. Then the city was attacked and captured. But the conqueror moved on to some other places. Since the neighboring city Harappa is also prehistoric, so it appears that Kamalia must have been part of an ancient civilization which remained untouched from the wrath of the nature. The old buildings amidst the "Iqbal Bazar" at the vantage point of the city, tell the story of a then progressive era. 

The 1947 Partition caused the Sikh and Hindu population to migrate from the area with many of their hidden items still being found after ages. Some nobles even donated their properties to the trust of the Government. Government Praim Sati Trust (P.S.T) College is one of those properties; which is the only public (general-subjects) college in Kamalia other than the Government Technical College of Commerce.

High School No. 1 Is One Of The Oldest School In Kamalia Established in 1921 and it stone was laid down by SIR WILLIAM MALCOLM HAILEY (K.C.S.I – C.I.E.) Governer of the Punjab on 11-09-1926. This School is renowned School of District Toba Tek Singh.

A number of archaic and archaeological sites exist in Kamalia including a Shamshan Ghat (Hindu Cremation Site), a Sikh Gurdawara and the ancient havelis.

After partition many groups came and settled in Kamalia City, among them there was huge community of Rai titled Rajputs who migrated from Eastern Punjab region from Cities like Jhalandar, Nakodar, Raikot Etc.

These Rai Families took Kamalia to new heights and raised Economic activity of the city. They contributed a lot into to literary, politics and agriculture of the city. They also made the very first markets in Kamalia City now Known as Rai Aziz Market, Rai Jameel Market, Rai Sultan Market and many more. They were the ones who brought market shopping concept to it before that there were two main Bazars known as Sadar Bazar and Iqbal Bazar. In todays time Rai community of the city is not much in numbers but they are playing vital roles in the welfare of this city.

It is one of the oldest cities in the Punjab Province having an old mosque of Jahangiri period. It has many historical places like shrine of Hazrat Baba Fazil Dewan, Dargahi Shah, Syed Shabbir Ahmed Shah of Dholar Sharif, Saint of Qdir Bakhsh Sharif. The land of the Tehsil is plane and most of land is under cultivation. The land is very fertile, wheat, sugar cane, rice and cotton etc. are the main crops of the Tehsil. Generally the inhabitants of Tehsil are agriculturists while the business of poultry in the shape of poultry forms in different part of Tehsil is graded at No. 2 in the whole Punjab. Furthermore, the city of Kamalia is famous at the national level due to its Khaddar and hand made carpets.

Etymology
The present name of the city Kamalia is derived from its 14th century ruler Kamal Khan Kharal.

Climate
The climate keeps changing with weathers. Summers are usually very hot and the temperatures may exceed 40 degrees, then comes Monsoon (Rainy season) with much closed environment and comparatively lesser rains as compared to the surrounding areas, then the Autumn with pleasant weather, then the Winters remain foggy and cold.

The most hazardous climatic threat to Kamalia is the flooding of River Ravi which is luckily a very rare phenomena.

Known for
Kamalia is famous for many things including the hand-woven or machine-woven cloth called "Khaddar", poultry, sugarcane crop and the okra crop. Although the land is fertile and many other crops are also cultivated around the year which include wheat, cotton, maze and rice. Such variety of crops make it an important place for the agriculture market.

Demography

References

Populated places in Toba Tek Singh District
Toba Tek Singh District